Jacinto Bienvenido Peynado Peynado (February 15, 1878 – March 7, 1940) was the president of the Dominican Republic from August 16, 1938, until February 24, 1940, during the Trujillo era. During his 31-year regime, dictator Rafael Trujillo appointed four individuals to serve as ceremonial presidents while retaining direct, behind-the-scenes control of the executive branch. Prior to ascending to the presidency, Peynado served as Trujillo's vice president from 1934 to 1938.

Peynado came from a distinguished Dominican family; he was the son of Jacinto Peynado Tejón (1829–1897) and Manuela María Peynado. His parents were related; they were uncle and niece to each other, respectively. Peynado was educated in Santo Domingo as a lawyer and worked as a law professor at University of Santo Domingo. He was appointed minister for justice (attorney general) and public education by President Ramón Báez in 1914 and retained that position in Juan Isidro Jimenez's government. He also served as minister of the interior (which in the Dominican Republic includes overseeing the National Police). His brother, Francisco, had negotiated with Charles Evans Hughes the treaty that terminated the occupation by the United States Marines in 1924.

Peynado briefly served as interim president of the Dominican Republic under the dictatorship of Rafael Trujillo, interrupting Rafael Estrella Urena's term of office from April 22, 1930, until May 21, 1930, when Urena resumed the presidency. Peynado served as secretary of the interior, police, and war in General Trujillo's subsequent government. He became secretary to the president in 1932, and was elected Trujillo's vice president in 1934. Peynado was Trujillo's hand-picked candidate in the elections held in 1938. He assumed the presidency on August 16, 1938, though Trujillo largely continued to control the country. Peynado retained office until February 24, 1940, when his ill health forced him to cede the presidency to Vice President Manuel de Jesús Troncoso de la Concha. He died in Santo Domingo (then named Ciudad Trujillo) on March 7, 1940.

Peynado married María de las Mercedes Soler Machado (1880–1956) on February 14, 1900. They had nine children: Ramón (1900–1903), Rosa Mercedes (1902–1946), José Bienvenido (1904–1971), Cristina Natalia (1906–1980), María Mireya (1912–1981), Enrique (1913–1997), María Dinorah (1915–2009), María Musetta (born 1920), and Augusta Victoria (born 1921). Only the youngest eight survived childhood.

His grandson, also named Jacinto Peynado, served as vice president of the Dominican Republic from 1994 to 1996.

References

Further reading
Crassweller RD. Trujillo. The Life and Times of a Caribbean Dictator. The MacMIllan Co, New York, 1966. pages 165–177. 

1878 births
1940 deaths
Presidents of the Dominican Republic
Vice presidents of the Dominican Republic
Dominican Party politicians
20th-century Dominican Republic politicians
People from San Cristóbal, Dominican Republic